Russula prolifica is a species of edible mushroom found in Madagascar. It is found under Eucalyptus robusta plantations there and has only become abundant in the past seventy years or so.

See also
 List of Russula species

References

prolifica
Fungi of Madagascar
Edible fungi
Fungi described in 2008